The Pennsylvania State Game Lands Number 324 are Pennsylvania State Game Lands in Berks County in Pennsylvania in the United States providing hunting, bird watching, and other activities.

Geography
Game Lands Number 324 is an island in the Schuylkill River just south of the City of Reading and is part of Cumru Township. Access is only by boat, or by wading when the water is low. Nearby communities include the boroughs of Kenhorst, Shillington, and populated places Birdland, Brookline, Clover Park, Crestwood, Deerfield Village, Gibraltar, Grill, Klapperthall Junction, Laurel Springs, Mifflin Park, Millmont, Neversink, Oakbrook, Oakbrook Terrace, Overbrook, Pheasant Run, Reiffton, Ridgewood, Seyfert, Valley Ridge Farms, Woodgate, and Wyomissing Park. The junction of Interstate 176 and U.S. Route 422 is located about a mile to the east of SGL 324. Pennsylvania Route 10, Pennsylvania Route 625 and Pennsylvania Route 724 pass nearby to the east and south of the Game Lands.

Statistics

See also
 Pennsylvania State Game Lands
 Pennsylvania State Game Lands Number 43, also located in Berks County
 Pennsylvania State Game Lands Number 52, also located in Berks County
 Pennsylvania State Game Lands Number 80, also located in Berks County
 Pennsylvania State Game Lands Number 106, also located in Berks County
 Pennsylvania State Game Lands Number 110, also located in Berks County
 Pennsylvania State Game Lands Number 182, also located in Berks County
 Pennsylvania State Game Lands Number 274, also located in Berks County
 Pennsylvania State Game Lands Number 280, also located in Berks County
 Pennsylvania State Game Lands Number 315, also located in Berks County

References

324
Protected areas of Berks County, Pennsylvania